Matrix was an Italian news program and talks show television, broadcast on Canale 5, from 2005 to 2020, and rerun on Mediaset Plus: it was a rival program of RAI flagship news program Porta a Porta.

Mediaset
Italian television talk shows
Current affairs shows
2005 Italian television series debuts
2000s Italian television series
2010s Italian television series
2020s Italian television series endings
Canale 5 original programming